The 1965 Kansas Jayhawks football team represented the University of Kansas in the Big Eight Conference during the 1965 NCAA University Division football season. In their eighth season under head coach Jack Mitchell, the Jayhawks compiled a 2–8 record (2–5 against conference opponents), tied for sixth in the Big Eight Conference, and were outscored by opponents by a combined total of 215 to 119. They played their home games at Memorial Stadium in Lawrence, Kansas.

The team's statistical leaders included Dan Miller with 356 rushing yards, Sims Stokes with 271 receiving yards and Bill Fenton with 500 passing yards. Greg Roth and Mike Shinn were the team captains.

Schedule

References

Kansas
Kansas Jayhawks football seasons
Kansas Jayhawks football